
Gmina Przecław is an urban-rural gmina (administrative district) in Mielec County, Subcarpathian Voivodeship, in south-eastern Poland.

Before 1 January 2010, when Przecław became a town, the district was classed as a rural gmina.

Villages
Apart from the town of Przecław, the gmina contains the villages and settlements of Biały Bór, Błonie, Dobrynin, Kiełków, Łączki Brzeskie, Podole, Rzemień, Tuszyma, Wylów and Zaborcze.

Neighbouring gminas
Gmina Przecław is bordered by the town of Mielec and by the gminas of Dębica, Mielec, Niwiska, Ostrów, Radomyśl Wielki and Żyraków.

References
Polish official population figures 2006

Przeclaw
Mielec County